Events from the year 1636 in Ireland.

Incumbent
Monarch: Charles I

Events
May 27–28 – cross-examination of a Galway jury on a charge of refusing to find the king's title to land, resulting in heavy fines and imprisonment until the jury submits in December.
May 31 – proclamation regulating the production of linen yarn.
August 12 – following a public disputation in Belfast, Henry Leslie, Church of Ireland Bishop of Down and Connor, sentences Edward Brice, Henry Calvert, James Hamilton, John Ridge and one other non-subscribing Presbyterian minister to silence.
Compilation of the Annals of the Four Masters is completed by Mícheál Ó Cléirigh, assisted by Cú Choigcríche Ó Cléirigh, Fearfeasa Ó Maol Chonaire and Peregrine Ó Duibhgeannain, in the Franciscan friary in Donegal Town under the patronage of Fearghal Ó Gadhra.
Ballyhornan is founded in County Down.

Arts and literature
May – London playwright James Shirley moves to work for four years under John Ogilby at the new Werburgh Street Theatre in Dublin, the first in Ireland.

Births
Richard Coote, 1st Earl of Bellomont, governor in the British North American colonies (d. 1701)
Richard Nagle, lawyer and politician (d. 1699)
Máel Ísa Ó Raghallaigh, harper.

Deaths
December 10 – Randal MacDonnell, 1st Earl of Antrim, peer.
Dominick Sarsfield, 1st Viscount Sarsfield, lawyer (b. c.1570)
Brockhill Taylor, landowner and politician.

References

 
1630s in Ireland
Ireland
Years of the 17th century in Ireland